Liudmila Samsonova defeated Belinda Bencic in the final, 1–6, 6–1, 6–3, to win the singles tennis title at the 2021 WTA German Open. Samsonova was contesting her first career final on the WTA Tour and had entered the main draw as a qualifier. Her win made her the 10th maiden titlist on the 2021 WTA Tour and the second qualifier of the season to claim a title.

Dinara Safina was the defending champion from when the event was last held in 2008 on clay courts, but she retired from professional tennis in 2014. As the inaugural edition of the tournament following its relaunch, this marked the first year the tournament was played on grass.

Seeds

Draw

Finals

Top half

Bottom half

Qualifying

Seeds

Qualifiers

Qualifying draw

First qualifier

Second qualifier

Third qualifier

Fourth qualifier

Fifth qualifier

Sixth qualifier

References

External links
Official website
WTA website
Main draw
Qualifying draw

Bett1open
Bett1open
Bett1open